Carmel School is an English medium, co-educational school located at Hathnoora district in Telangana, Andra Pradesh, India. It has classes from kindergarten to standard ten. It was established in 2005 and is currently being managed by the Montfort Brothers of St Gabriel.

Religious affiliation
Carmel School is affiliated to Montfort Brothers of St. Gabriel, a Catholic worldwide religious order dedicated to the transformation of society through the promotion of education.  The Montfort Brothers of St. Gabriel, also known as Montfort Brothers, engage in their education apostolate by administering schools, technical institutes and orphanages in 56 dioceses across the country.

Education
The academic session at Carmel School begins in June. The syllabus of the school is in accordance with the Telangana board, which is the state board of Telangana.  A computer lab, science labs and a well-stocked library supplement class-room teaching supporter the learning atmosphere in the institute.

The school seeks to develop leadership qualities among the students. All students of the secondary school belong to one of four houses. Each house has a House Captain from standard ten and a Vice-Captain from standard nine. Additionally, a School Captain and Vice-Captain are elected from standard ten. The student representatives take oath of office through a colourful investiture ceremony in the beginning of the academic year. These student representatives assist the teachers in maintaining student discipline and lead student and ceremonial activities.

Annual events
The annual day is a significant event in the life of the Carmel School Community. It is an occasion to celebrate Montfortian ethos and an expression of creativity and imagination on the part of the students.

The yearly Sports Day is a platform for students to hone their skills and show-case their talents in various games and athletic events.

The religious festivals of various communities are celebrated, so as to instil a healthy respect for diverse religious and cultural traditions of the country into the minds of the students.

References

https://web.archive.org/web/20160803090022/http://www.montfortpuneprovince.org/aboutus.htm

Brothers of Christian Instruction of St Gabriel schools
Catholic schools in India
Christian schools in Telangana
Sangareddy district
2005 establishments in Andhra Pradesh
Educational institutions established in 2005